Crossballs: The Debate Show is a Comedy Central television show which poked fun at cable news networks' political debate shows, especially CNN's Crossfire and MSNBC's Hardball with Chris Matthews.  In each episode, comedians posing as experts on a particular subject would debate two real commentators.  The true experts were unaware that the show was a sham.  Topics ranged from reality television to religion to violence in video games.

It debuted on July 6, 2004 and ran for eight weeks. It aired Tuesday-Friday at 7:30 p.m. ET. The twenty-third and final episode aired on August 25, 2004. Show number 24 ("Pistol Whipped America") was taped but never aired, after one unsuspecting guest named James March threatened to sue Comedy Central. A further legal threat came from radio comedian Phil Hendrie, who publicly accused the show's creators of stealing the concept of a show he pitched to Comedy Central in 1998, as well as that of The Phil Hendrie Show.

Cast members
 Chris Tallman - Host of Crossballs
 Matt Besser - Fake Guest Debater
 Mary Birdsong - Fake Guest Debater
 Andrew Daly - Fake Guest Debater
 Jerry Minor - Fake Guest Debater
 Sean Conroy - Occasional Fake Guest Debater (3 episodes)
 Rich Fulcher - Occasional Fake Guest Debater (2 episodes)

Episodes

Notable real guests
 Chris Simcox - Minuteman Civil Defense Corps founder and spokesperson
 Wiley Drake - outspoken Southern Baptist evangelist
 Dave Kong - director of the American Atheists California chapter
 Jackie Christie - wife of professional basketball player Doug Christie

External links
 
 Digital Spy article
 Crossballs Puzzle: Why don't the guests on Comedy Central's fake debate show get the joke?, Jacob Sullum, Reason, July 30, 2004
 Email account of nearly appearing on Crossballs by Lauren Weinstein

2004 American television series debuts
2004 American television series endings
2000s American political comedy television series
2000s American satirical television series
2000s American television news shows
American news parodies
Comedy Central original programming
Debate television series
English-language television shows
Political satirical television series
Television series about television
Hoaxers